Muhammad Quli is a Turkic-derived Muslim male given name meaning 'slave of Muhammad'.  It is built from quli. It is equivalent to Arabic-derived Abd al-Muhammad or Persian-derived Gholammohammad.

People
Muhammad Quli Qutb Shah
Muhammad Quli Musavi
Muhammadquli Khan
Mohammad Qoli Salim Tehrani
Mohammad-Qoli Khan of Erivan
Mohammad-Qoli Khan Qajar
Muhammetguly Ogshukov